Lionheart: Tussle with the Beast is the second studio album by the English rapper Klashnekoff, released in 2007 on Riddim Killa Records. It was produced by Joe Buddha. It charted at No. 105 on the UK Albums Chart.

On his next studio album Back to the Sagas, Klashnekoff dismissed Lionheart as a purely financially motivated project and described his difficult relationship with Buddha, "To keep it real, I was never feeling that album from day one. 'Cause that weren't my ting...just something me and Buhdha should have got paid for. But it took over a year and a half so between me and Buddha it caused complications. Six months past there was no conversation, just pure back and forth hating. Then a phone call got made and it was all ended in one conversation."

Track listing

References

2007 albums
Klashnekoff albums